The Air Force Historical Research Agency (AFHRA) is the repository for United States Air Force historical documents. The Agency's collection begun during World War II in Washington, D.C. and moved in 1949 to Maxwell Air Force Base, the site of Air University, to provide research facilities for professional military education students, the faculty, visiting scholars, and the general public.

The U.S Air Force History Office in Bolling Air Force Base 
Building 5681 in Washington, D.C. houses microfilm copies of archival materials in the United States Air Force Historical Research Center at Maxwell Air Force Base.

Published guides of the collection include the Air Force Historical Archives Document Classification Guide (1971), Personal Papers in the USAF Historical Research Center compiled by Richard E. Morse and Thomas C. Lobenstein (1980), U.S. Air Force Oral History Catalog (1982), and the United States Air Force History: A Guide to Documentary Sources.

Holdings
Holdings include published and unpublished reports and oral histories on topics including:

 Col. Bernt Balchen correspondence, memos, and articles on polar regions

BRIG. GEN. William N. Best Air Force oral history program interview No. 717.
GEOPHYSICS IN CONNECTION WITH THE "INTERNATIONAL YEAR OF THE QUIET SUN" 1964-65
GERMAN METEOROLOGICAL SERVICE, WORLD WAR II report on its organization, duties, and responsibilities to the Luftwaffe. 1944.
400TH AEROSPACE APPLICATIONS GROUP. History, 1963–73.
AIR WEATHER SERVICE history, 1945–46.
AIR WEATHER SERVICE history, 1966–67.
ARMY AIR FORCES TRAINING COMMAND history of the weather training program, 1939–1945.
CLIMATE AND WEATHER MODIFICATION Air Force History Narrative.
EASTERN TECHNICAL TRAINING COMMAND contract meteorology schools report on the experiment ato train Air Force Weather Officers, 1944
FIFTH AIR FORCE, history of participation in Project Grayback (Fulton surface-to-air recovery system) 1955
METEOROLOGICAL SATELLITE PROGRAM, STUDY OF METEOROLOGY AFFECTING ALMOST EVERY PHASE OF AIR FORCE OPERATIONS, 1961.
THIRTEENTH AIR FORCE, history of participation in Project 119-L, which provided for a worldwide meteorological survey between 1 Nov. 1955 and 1 April 1956
GEN Curtis Lemay correspondence on meteorology.
METEOROLOGICAL CONDITIONS DURING MILITARY OPERATIONS. 1942–present.
METEOROLOGICAL EQUIPMENT FOR POLAR ICE PACK STATION.
METEOROLOGICAL SOUNDING SYSTEM, AF Global Weather Central.
METEOROLOGICAL SURVEY, an aerial photography of Western Europe, etc. 1945.
METEOROLOGISTS TO THE BALLOON CORPS, National Association of American Balloon Corps Veterans.

See also
 History of the United States Air Force
 Fairchild Memorial Hall
 Air Force History and Museums Program

References

External links
 
 Army Air Forces Research Help
 Air Force History Support Office
 U.S. Air Force Museum

1949 establishments in Alabama
Organizations established in 1949
20th-century history of the United States Air Force
Historical Research Agency
Military education and training in the United States
Military in Alabama
Archives in the United States
Organizations based in Montgomery, Alabama
Oral history